Sergey Yurevich Sirant (born 12 April 1994) is a Russian badminton player. He won his first international title at the 2015 Riga International, and clinched the Grand Prix title in 2017 Russian Open. Sirant was the men's singles National Champions in 2017 and 2018. He competed at the 2020 Tokyo Olympics.

Achievements

BWF Grand Prix (1 title) 
The BWF Grand Prix had two levels, the Grand Prix and Grand Prix Gold. It was a series of badminton tournaments sanctioned by the Badminton World Federation (BWF) and played between 2007 and 2017.

Men's singles

  BWF Grand Prix Gold tournament
  BWF Grand Prix tournament

BWF International Challenge/Series (1 title, 5 runners-up) 
Men's singles

Men's doubles

  BWF International Challenge tournament
  BWF International Series tournament
  BWF Future Series tournament

References

External links 
 

1994 births
Living people
Sportspeople from Vladivostok
Russian male badminton players
Badminton players at the 2020 Summer Olympics
Olympic badminton players of Russia